Yuzband may refer to:
 Yuzband, Ahar
 Yuzband, Kaleybar